Kelly Barnes Dam was an earthen embankment dam in Stephens County, Georgia, just outside the city of Toccoa. Heavy rainfall caused it to collapse on November 6, 1977, and the resulting flood killed 39 people and caused $2.8 million in damage. The dam was never rebuilt. 

A memorial to the dead stands downstream, by Toccoa Falls on the campus of Toccoa Falls College.

History 
In 1899, a rock crib dam was built by E. P. Simpson to create a reservoir for a small hydroelectric power plant that began operating that same year. The plant, now a historical site on the Toccoa Falls College campus called the Old Toccoa Falls Power Plant, produced 200 kW for the town of Toccoa, Georgia. The power plant was transferred in 1933 to the Toccoa Falls Institute, which decided to develop a more stable electric power source and built an earthen embankment dam over the original rock crib dam between 1939 and 1940. After World War II, the dam was again raised, creating Barnes Lake, a  reservoir. The modifications provided power for Toccoa Falls Institute until 1957, when the power production was stopped, and the lake was thereafter used only for recreation.

Dam characteristics 

The dam had two uncontrolled earthen spillways. A low point on the right side and away from the dam could also be used as a secondary spillway when the reservoir levels became too high.

The dam sat on a foundation of silt and stable biotite gneiss (rock).

Within the dam embankment were two masonry structures. One helped support a pipe that was used as a low-level spillway. The other contained a penstock (pipe) for the hydroelectricity power plant. Neither was being used at the time of the flood.

Dam failure 

On November 6, 1977, at 1:30 am, the Kelly Barnes Dam failed after four days of heavy rain:  had fallen from November 2 to 5 — half of that between 6 pm and midnight on November 5. The rain swelled Barnes Lake, which normally held  of water, to an estimated  of water. 

The flood killed 39 people and destroyed nine houses, 18 house trailers, two college buildings and many motor vehicles. Five houses and five college buildings were also damaged. Two bridges on Toccoa Falls Drive and a culvert at County Farm Road were completely destroyed. The embankments at Georgia State Route 17 were destroyed on either side of the bridge, and one of the bridge abutments at Highview Road was destroyed. The water-supply pipe for the city of Toccoa was damaged and the city's water supply was contaminated for several days. The cost of the damage was $2.8 million. 

After the flood, Georgia's Governor George Busbee called for an immediate investigation, which was carried out by a Federal Investigative Board of the United States Geological Survey. Their report was released December 21, 1977, with no specific causes cited for the failure. The investigators had no engineering plans for the dam and records of construction on the dam were based on witnesses, pictures, and newspaper articles.

The investigation did, however, cite several possible or probable causes. The failure of the dam's slope may have contributed to weakness in the structure, particularly in the heavy rain. A collapse of the low-level spillway could have also exacerbated this problem. Overall, the dam itself was in poor condition and lacked a sufficient design.

See also 

 Buffalo Creek Flood
 Johnstown Flood
 St. Francis Dam
 South Fork Dam
 Teton Dam

References

Further reading

External links 
 Toccoa Falls College Toccoa Falls College Dam Break Memorial Page
 USGS Report USGS Report on the Kelly Barnes Dam Failure
 WSB-TV video Wilkerson Examines the Wreckage of the Toccoa Flood, Nov. 9, 1977. Walter J. Brown Media Archives and Peabody Awards Collection, University of Georgia Libraries. Web. 5 June 2016.
 WSB-TV video Residents of Toccoa Falls Explain How They Survived the Flood, Nov. 6, 1978. Walter J. Brown Media Archives and Peabody Awards Collection, University of Georgia Libraries. Web. 5 June 2016.
 WSB-TV video Memorial Service Is Held for Toccoa Falls College Students Who Were Killed in the Flood, Nov. 9, 1977. Walter J. Brown Media Archives and Peabody Awards Collection, University of Georgia Libraries. Web. 5 June 2016.
 Toccoa Falls Power Plant Toccoa Falls Power Plant historical marker

Disasters in Georgia (U.S. state)
Dam failures in the United States
1977 disasters in the United States
Buildings and structures in Stephens County, Georgia
1977 in Georgia (U.S. state)
Dams in Georgia (U.S. state)
United States privately owned dams
November 1977 events in the United States
Toccoa Falls College
1899 establishments in Georgia (U.S. state)
1977 disestablishments in Georgia (U.S. state)